The 2020 South Alabama Jaguars football team represented the University of South Alabama in the 2020 NCAA Division I FBS football season. The Jaguars played their home games at Hancock Whitney Stadium in Mobile, Alabama, and competed in the West Division of the Sun Belt Conference. They were led by third-year head coach Steve Campbell.

This was the team's first season at Hancock Whitney Stadium, after competing for 10 years at Ladd–Peebles Stadium. After the team completed their season with a 4–7 record (3–5 in conference play), Campbell was fired on December 6, 2020.

Schedule
South Alabama had games scheduled against Florida and Grambling State, but were canceled due to the COVID-19 pandemic.

Game summaries

at Southern Miss

Tulane

UAB

Texas State

Louisiana–Monroe

at Georgia Southern

at Coastal Carolina

at Louisiana

Georgia State

at Arkansas State

Troy

References

South Alabama
South Alabama Jaguars football seasons
South Alabama Jaguars football